is a Japanese pitcher for the Hanshin Tigers in Japan's Nippon Professional Baseball. He was selected as a member in the 2006 World Baseball Classic.

External links

1981 births
Living people
Baseball people from Saitama Prefecture
Japanese baseball players
Nippon Professional Baseball pitchers
Hanshin Tigers players
2006 World Baseball Classic players
Japanese baseball coaches
Nippon Professional Baseball coaches